Lazer Guided Melodies is the debut studio album by English space rock band Spiritualized. The album was recorded by the inaugural line up of the band, consisting of Jason Pierce (vocals, guitars), Mark Refoy (guitars), Will Carruthers (bass), Jonny Mattock (drums) and Kate Radley (keyboards) from 1990 to 1991, and mixed by Pierce in London in January 1992. The album was first released on Dedicated Records in March 1992, on cassette, Compact Disc and Vinyl (2 x LP, with initial copies containing an additional free 7").

Initially released on two 45rpm vinyl LPs, the album's twelve songs are segued together into four colour-coded (red, green, blue, black), cross-faded suites. As such, the album was included in Pitchforks 2010 list of "ten unusual CD-era gimmicks".

By 1995, the album had sold 10,000 copies in the United States.

Background
Lazer Guided Melodies is unique in Jason Pierce's oeuvre as it simultaneously explores motorik, minimalist music, and space rock while subtly using "meticulously detailed, layered instrumentation, the sumptuous deployment of horns and strings" to create cinematic, textured, and deeply narcotic soundscapes. Pierce reported that the album cost £3800 to produce. 

Critic Simon Reynolds wrote in his Melody Maker review of the album:

Music
The album is described musically as dream pop, space rock, and shoegaze.

Legacy
Lazer Guided Melodies was included in the book 1001 Albums You Must Hear Before You Die. In 2018, Pitchfork ranked the album at number 11 on its list of "The 30 Best Dream Pop Albums".

Track listing

On the LP edition, tracks 1–3 are the "Red" section, tracks 4–7 are the "Green" section, tracks 8–9 are the "Blue" section, and tracks 10–12 are the "Black" section. Track 4, "Run", contains elements of "Call Me the Breeze" by J. J. Cale and "Run Run Run" by The Velvet Underground.

Personnel
Credits adapted from liner notes.

Spiritualized
 Jason Pierce – guitar (Fender Telecaster, Eko Rocket, acoustic guitar), dulcimer, autoharp, piano, vocals
 Kate Radley – keyboards (Vox Continental, Farfisa, piano), vocals
 Mark Refoy – guitar (Gretsch Country Gent, Epiphone Casino, Fender Telecaster), acoustic guitar, dulcimer
 Will Carruthers – bass (Gibson Thunderbird)
 Jonny Mattock – drums, percussion, dulcimer

Additional musicians
 Simon Clarke – flute
 Roddy Lorimer – trumpet
 Will Gregory – saxophone
 Colin Humphries – cello
 Martin Robinson – cello
 Owen John – violin

Technical personnel
 Jason Pierce – production, mixing
 Barry Clempson – mixing, engineering, production
 Angus Wallace – engineering
 Declan O'Regan – engineering
 Mike Long – engineering
 Paul Adkins – engineering
 Chris Blair – mastering
 Gavin Lindsay – artwork
 Pete Gardner – photographer
 Andrew Sutton – sleeve design
 Albert Tupelo – sleeve design

Charts

References

1992 debut albums
Spiritualized albums
Dedicated Records albums